"San Antonio Rose" is a swing instrumental introduced in late 1938 by Bob Wills and His Texas Playboys. Quickly becoming the band's most popular number, Wills and band members devised lyrics, which were recorded on April 16, 1940, and released on Okeh 5694 in August as "New San Antonio Rose". Despite having completed a lengthy Hillbilly/Folk chart run in 1939, which culminated at #1, it quickly rose to the top again, in early 1941. It went on to become the band's theme song for the next forty years, reverting to its original title.

The song is written in the first person with the "Rose of San Antone" being the singer's lost love. In 2010, the Western Writers of America ranked it at number 49 on its list of the Top 100 Western songs of all time.

Recordings
While it was also a successful hit for other Hillbilly artists, it also broke through to the pop charts, where Bing Crosby's version reached #7 on December 16, 1940.
Over a million copies were sold, for which he was awarded a gold disc.

The song was the third dominating hit by Wills in the Western Swing field over the last five years. "Spanish Two Step" was second to only Mexicali Rose in 1936, "Steel Guitar Rag" topped the 1937 chart, and this one finished in the top ten in 1939 and 1940. The Texas Playboys finished with thirteen Number one chart hits.

The song, both the music and lyrics, reflects the Mexican influence Bob Wills found growing up in the Southwest. Wills developed the melody of the original "San Antonio Rose" itself from a traditional tune, "Spanish Two Step", by playing the bridge in reverse.

"New San Antonio Rose" ruffled the feathers of Southern country music moguls when Wills and the Playboys performed it with horns and a drum at the Grand Ole Opry on December 30, 1944.

Film appearances
1941: San Antonio Rose
1982: Honkytonk Man
1985: Sweet Dreams – sung by Patsy Cline

Cover versions
The song has been recorded by many artists in several genres. 
 The pseudonymous Jericho wrote the Swedish lyrics. A Swedish version was recorded by Ingalill Rossvald and Harry Brandelius with Thorsten Sjögren's orchestra in Stockholm on February 7, 1952. It was released on the 78 rpm record His Master's Voice X 7795.
 American pianist Floyd Cramer had his version go to No. 8 on both the Billboard Hot 100 pop and country singles charts in 1961.
 In 1966, Harry James released a version on his album Harry James & His Western Friends  (Dot DLP 3735 and 25735)
 American R&B and boogie-woogie pianist and singer Little Willie Littlefield recorded a version for his 1982 album Houseparty.
 Other notable recordings are by Patsy Cline, Clint Eastwood, Floyd Cramer, Gene Autry, Gordon MacRae, Jo Stafford, The Mills Brothers, Pat Boone, Patti Page, John Denver, Steve Lawrence, Teresa Brewer, and Don Wilkerson.

Other uses
It lends its name to San Antonio Rose Palace in San Antonio, Texas, owned by George Strait.

Tish Hinojosa's "San Antonio Romeo", on her album Culture Swing, provides Rose's side of the story.

References

Bibliography
Boyd, Jean Ann. Jazz of the Southwest: An Oral History of Western Swing. Austin: University of Texas Press, 1998. 
Dorman, Robert. It Happened in Oklahoma. Globe Pequot Press, 2006) . 
Gioia, Ted "Bob Wills & His Texas Playboys: New San Antonio Rose", Jazz.com, July 8, 2008
La Chapelle, Peter. Proud to Be an Okie: Cultural Politics, Country Music, and Migration to Southern California. University of California Press, 2007. 
Kienzle, Rich. Southwest Shuffle: Pioneers of Honky Tonk, Western Swing, and Country Jazz. New York: Routledge, 2003. 
McWhorter, Frankie. Cowboy Fiddler in Bob Wills' Band. University of North Texas Press, 1997. 
Whitburn, Joel. The Billboard Book of Top 40 Country Hits. Billboard Books, 2006. 
Wolff, Kurt; Orla Duane. Country Music: The Rough Guide. Rough Guides, 2000. 

Western swing songs
Western music (North America)
1938 songs
1940 singles
Willie Nelson songs
Floyd Cramer songs
Grammy Hall of Fame Award recipients
Songs about Texas
Songs written by Bob Wills
United States National Recording Registry recordings
Ray Price (musician) songs
Little Willie Littlefield songs
1961 singles